Caenocephaloides is a genus of flies in the family Stratiomyidae.

Species
Caenocephaloides melanarius (Walker, 1861)

References

Stratiomyidae
Brachycera genera
Taxa named by Embrik Strand
Diptera of Australasia